Bif Naked Forever: Acoustic Hits & Other Delights is an acoustic album from singer-songwriter Bif Naked, which was released digitally on 4 December 2012.

Track listing 
 "So Happy I Could Die" 
 "The Only One" 
 "Spaceman"
 "Daddy's Getting Married"
 "My Bike"
 "October Song"
 "Nobody Knows" 
 "Supergirl"
 "Moment of Weakness"
 "Lucky"
 "Tango Shoes"
 "Honeybee"
 "I Love Myself Today"
 "Chotee" 1

Note 1. Denotes new studio tracks.

References

External links 
 Official Site

Bif Naked albums
2012 albums